Boroughmuir Thistle Football Club is a Scottish women's association football club founded in 2007. It is the largest girls and women's football club in Scotland and a club at the heart of community in the South East of Edinburgh. The club has a long term partnership with Edinburgh University and Edinburgh University Women's football club. The club are based at various locations around Edinburgh including youth teams at Meggetland Sports Complex, Peffermill Sports Grounds, Meadowbank Stadium all facilities are in Edinburgh. They are members of the Scottish Women's Premier League and compete in women football's second tier, SWPL 2. They have various regional teams from under 8 - to under 18 age groups. They also have National Academy Programme teams who played under Scottish Women's Football including under 14, under 16 and under 18 which is part of the Purple Pathway. These teams play some of the best club teams in Scotland. The "Purple Pathway" is the journey and development of players as they progress through the youth academy to adult football. The club has produced several players since it was founded who have played professional football and also played at college and university level.

References

Women's football clubs in Scotland
Football clubs in Edinburgh
Scottish Women's Football League clubs
Scottish Women's Premier League clubs